James Anthony Lawrence Phoenix (born 15 January 1984) is an English former footballer who is last known to have played as a midfielder, winger, or attacker for Northwich Victoria.

Career

As a youth player, Phoenix rejected offers from the youth academies of Manchester United and Liverpool, England's most successful clubs.

Before the 2007 season, he signed for Đồng Tháp in Vietnam after playing for English non-league side United of Manchester.

In 2007, he signed for Sabah in the Malaysian second division after almost signing for an Omani team.

Before the second half of 2009/10, Phoenix signed for Vllaznia in Albania and he also played for Bylis and Luftëtari in Albania.

In 2013, he signed for English non-league outfit Northwich Victoria.

References

External links
 Jamie Phoenix at playmakertstats.com
 Jamie Phoenix at footballdatabase.eu

English footballers
Northwich Victoria F.C. players
F.C. United of Manchester players
Nantwich Town F.C. players
Living people
Expatriate footballers in Malaysia
Expatriate footballers in Vietnam
V.League 1 players
Kategoria Superiore players
Dong Thap FC players
KF Bylis players
Luftëtari Gjirokastër players
Footballers from Manchester
KF Vllaznia Shkodër players
Association football wingers
Association football forwards
1984 births
Association football midfielders
Sabah F.C. (Malaysia) players
English expatriate footballers
English expatriate sportspeople in Vietnam
English expatriate sportspeople in Malaysia
Expatriate footballers in Albania